"Refrain" is a French song co-written by Émile Gardaz and Géo Voumard, and performed by Lys Assia. The song represented Switzerland in the inaugural edition of the Eurovision Song Contest in 1956 and became the first winner of the Contest.

The song is in the classic chanson mode and laments the lost loves of the singer's "adolescence". The French original reads "vingt ans", which can also be rendered "twenties" in English.

Eurovision Song Contest
The European Broadcasting Union which organises the contest allowed two entries from each country for the only time. Lys Assia was one of only two performers, alongside Luxembourg, to represent her country for both entries. That followed the Swiss national final which chose both of her interpretations out of eleven songs interpreted by several singers in Switzerland's different official languages.

The countries performed in the same order via two rounds and Assia had previously performed "Das alte Karussell" in German as the second song of the evening. "Refrain" thus performed ninth, following the Netherlands' Corry Brokken with "Voorgoed voorbij" and preceding Belgium's Mony Marc with "Le plus beau jour de ma vie". After the interval act, "Refrain" was declared the winner without revealing the other song's ranks nor the number of points to the winner as well.

Claims were raised that it won as a result of procedures which included a secret voting with an option for juries to vote for their own country's songs, alongside allowing the Swiss jury to vote on behalf of Luxembourg which couldn't send juries.

The 25 May 1956 issue of the Italian newspaper La Stampa, published the day after the contest, wrote that "Refrain" got in total 102 points, and which count of 72.8% of the theoretical votes available for each song. That is based on a claim that each jury member ranked each song between 1 and 10 points, meaning each song could have obtained a maximum of 120 to 140 points; depending on whether jury members also voted for their own country.

The two songs were succeeded as Swiss representative at the 1957 contest by Assia again with "L'enfant que j'étais", and "Refrain" was succeeded as Contest winner in 1957 by Corry Brokken representing the Netherlands with "Net als toen".

Other achievements
Assia revealed in 2011 that she dedicated all royalties she made from the song to charity.

Assia performed the song in 2005 as part of the interval acts of "Congratulations: 50 Years of the Eurovision Song Contest", which was broadcast to dozens of countries with a public voting competition to crown the best Eurovision song in the contest's history.

According to the data calculated at "Hit Parade Italia" which presents weekly and top 100 yearly positions for a mix of both Italian and international songs, "Refrain" is ranked the 50th most successful song in Italy in 1956.

References

External links 

Eurovision songs of Switzerland
Eurovision songs of 1956
French-language Swiss songs
Eurovision Song Contest winning songs
Songs with music by Géo Voumard
Songs with lyrics by Émile Gardaz
Decca Records singles
1956 songs